This page provides the summaries of the CAF Second Round matches for the 1994 FIFA World Cup qualification. The nine qualifiers (the nine group winners from the first round) were split into three groups of three. Teams in each group played a home-and-away round-robin, with the three groups winners advancing to the World Cup Finals.

Group A

Ranking 

Nigeria qualified for the World Cup.

Results

Group B

Ranking 

Morocco qualified for the World Cup.

Results

Group C

Ranking 

Cameroon qualified for the World Cup.

Results

References

2
Qual